Yevgeny Semyon Vindman (born June 6, 1975) is a United States Army colonel and a national security and international law expert. He was a deputy legal advisor for the United States National Security Council (NSC) until he was reassigned on February 7, 2020.  While he was assigned to the NSC, his portfolio included work with international organizations such as NATO, the International Criminal Court, African affairs, emerging technologies, international humanitarian law, human rights, and ethics. Prior to the National Security Council, he served in a variety of roles in the U.S. Army Judge Advocate General Corps, including senior policy attorney-adviser for the labor and employment division at the Pentagon, senior prosecutor (DA equivalent) for Fort Hood, and operational law attorney for U.S. Forces-Iraq. He served for 12 years as an infantry officer, including an assignment as an airborne infantry platoon leader in the 82nd Airborne Division. He has a master's degree in administration and an L.L.M., and is a graduate of the University of Georgia School of Law and Binghamton University. He is an expert in the law of armed conflict, military law, government ethics, and national security law. He is the author of multiple articles on national security, cyber, and international relations featured in Foreign Affairs magazine, Foreign Policy magazine, Lawfare and Just Security blog.

Vindman came to national attention in October 2019 when his twin brother, Lieutenant Colonel Alexander Vindman, testified before the United States Congress regarding the Trump–Ukraine scandal. Yevgeny received the report of President Trump's phone call from Alex and reported the call to senior White House Lawyers. Alex's testimony provided evidence that resulted in a charge of abuse of power in the impeachment of Donald Trump.

Early life and education 
Yevgeny Semyon Vindman (né Yevgeny Semyonovich Vindman) and his identical twin brother Alexander were born in the Ukrainian Soviet Socialist Republic, Soviet Union to a Jewish family. After the death of their mother, the three-year-old twins and their older brother Leonid were brought to New York in December 1979 by their father, Semyon (Simon). They grew up in Brooklyn's Brighton Beach neighborhood. The twins appear briefly with their maternal grandmother in the Ken Burns documentary The Statue of Liberty. Vindman speaks fluent Russian. He graduated in 1992 from Franklin Delano Roosevelt High School.

In 1997, Vindman graduated from the State University of New York at Binghamton in Binghamton, New York with a bachelor of arts degree in history. He took part in the Reserve Officers' Training Corps while in college and received a second lieutenant's commission in the Army's Infantry Branch in January 1997. He later received a master of science degree from Central Michigan University in General Administration, a Juris Doctor (JD) from the University of Georgia School of Law in 2006, and a Masters in Legal Letters (LLM) from the Judge Advocate Generals Legal Center and School (TJAGLCS).

Career 
Vindman completed the Infantry Officer Basic Course (IOBC) at Fort Benning in 1998 and was sent to the 82D Airborne Division in Fort Bragg, NC, where he led both airborne infantry and airborne anti-armor platoons. In addition to an overseas assignment to Germany, Vindman is a combat veteran of the Iraq War. He served in Iraq from January 2011 to June 2011 in Operation New Dawn. He was promoted to the rank of major in 2006, to lieutenant colonel in 2016, and to colonel in 2021.

During his Army career, Vindman earned the Expert Infantryman Badge, the Air Assault Badge and Parachutist Badge, as well as three Army Achievement Medals, three Army Commendation Medals, one Joint Service Commendation Medal, and six Meritorious Service Medals.

Beginning in 2012, Vindman became a Army Judge Advocate. In this capacity he served as a brigade judge advocate in Germany and senior trail counsel/ chief of justice for Fort Hood, Texas, at the time the busiest court martial judication in the world. As senior trial counsel, he tried 7 serious felony cases including kidnapping, sexual assaults, and fraud. Returning to Washington, D.C. he was then a senior labor attorney-advisor for the Department of the Army. Vindman was on the Army Staff at the Pentagon from July 2016 to July 2018.

National Security Council
In July 2018, Vindman accepted an assignment with the National Security Council. In his role on the NSC, Vindman became a deputy legal advisor. He was later promoted to agency ethics official on the NSC and became the senior ethics official on the NSC.  On July 25, 2019, Alex Vindman listened to a phone call between Presidents Trump and Zelensky and was concerned by the contents, saying that he "did not think it was proper to demand that a foreign government investigate a U.S. citizen," and "was worried about the implications for the U.S. Government's support of Ukraine." Alex believed that the call would "undermine U.S. national security." Alex immediately reported the call to Y. Vindman, who was the lead ethics attorney and a deputy legal advisor. Vindman recognized the serious legal ramification of the call, including violations of law, and the legal/political jeopardy President Trump faced. Vindman advised that they both further report the call through channels to the NSC's lead counsel, John Eisenberg. Vindman had two more conversations with Mr. Eisenberg about the July 25, 2019 phone call. The first follow-up conversation occurred on August 1, 2019. Vindman sought to clarify with Mr. Eisenberg their role and obligations as attorneys, and whether as attorneys they were duty-bound to represent the Office of the President of the United States or the individual serving as President. Vindman had a second conversation with Mr. Eisenberg on August 5, 2019, when he conveyed his concern that President Trump's request that President Zelensky investigate President Trump's political rival may have violated the Federal Bribery Statute, the Foreign Corrupt Practices Act, and federal election laws. Once the call became public, both brothers received threats and denunciation, and reached out to the Army regarding their family's safety.

Y. Vindman helped his brother throughout the impeachment, including by drafting the portion of the opening statement where A. Vindman assured their father that he had made the right decision in emigrating from the Soviet Union to the United States. A. Vindman stated, "In Russia, my act of ... offering public testimony involving the President would surely cost me my life. I am grateful for my father's brave act of hope 40 years ago and for the privilege of being an American citizen and public servant, where I can live free of fear for mine  and my family's safety. Dad, my sitting here today, in the U.S. Capitol talking to our elected officials is proof that you made the right decision forty years ago to leave the Soviet Union and come here to United States of America in search of a better life for our family. Do not worry, I will be fine for telling the truth."

Vindman met with an NSC Special Assistant, at the Special Assistant's request, on January 17, 2020. During their conversation, the Special Assistant raised allegations that Mr. O'Brien and Mr. Gray had engaged in sexism, Anti-deficiency Act violations, and ethical conduct violations. On January 30, 2020, Vindman met with Mr. Ellis and Mr. Eisenberg, and conveyed to them the allegations that the NSC Special Assistant had discussed with him on January 17, 2020. In his conversation with Mr. Ellis and Mr. Eisenberg, Vindman reported that an NSC staff member told him that Mr. O'Brien and Mr. Gray had engaged in sexist conduct by making inappropriate comments about women's looks; that an NSC staff member was asked to carry out personal errands in violation of 5 CFR sec. 2635.705, "Standards of Ethical Conduct for Employees of the Executive Branch, Use of official time"; that this staff member reported that NSC "Challenge" coins were purchased with appropriated funds; and that Mr. O'Brien awarded these coins to foreigners violating the Purpose Statute and the Anti-deficiency Act. On March 6, 2020, his awareness of essentially the same allegations that the NSC Special Assistant told him in mid-January 2020 was memorialized.

On February 7, 2020, Y. Vindman told NSC colleagues he expected to leave the White House's National Security Council to return to the Department of Defense. Trump had earlier implied he might remove both Vindman brothers from their posts. Later that day, Vindman was escorted out of the White House, according to his attorney. His twin brother, Lieutenant Colonel Alex Vindman, was also escorted off the White House grounds at the same time. Both were slated for reassignment within the Army.

On February 10, 2020, then-Senate Minority Leader Chuck Schumer (D-NY) sent a letter in an apparent response to the firing of the two brothers that requested federal Inspectors General investigate possible retaliation against "anyone who has made, or in the future makes, protected disclosures of presidential misconduct." On February 13, Trump's former chief of staff, retired Marine General John Kelly, defended Vindman's actions and testimony. "He did exactly what we teach them to do from cradle to grave. He went and told his boss what he just heard," Kelly said.

During a panel discussion held on February 11, 2020, at the Atlantic Council, the president's National Security Advisor, Robert C. O'Brien said that it was his decision to transfer both Vindman brothers back to the Army for re-assignment and denied that the move was ordered by Trump in retaliation for Vindman's testimony. "I can absolutely tell you that they were not retaliated against", O'Brien told the panel. O'Brien also disputed the move as being characterized as "fired" since both brothers remain on active duty. O'Brien noted that their transfer was part of a larger NSA staff reduction. His remarks contradicted Trump, who tweeted that he had ousted Vindman for insubordination and for doing "a lot of bad things."

In August 2020, Vindman filed a complaint of retaliation against the White House in violation of 10 U.S.C. 1034. On May 18, 2022, the Department of Defense Inspector General issued a report substantiating that Vindman faced retaliation for his role in the impeachment and the subsequent report of misconduct by NSA O'Brien. DODOIG found, "based on a preponderance of the evidence, that [Vindman] was the subject of unfavorable personnel actions from administration officials, as defined by section 1034, title 10, United States Code (10 U.S.C. § 1034), 'Protected communications; prohibition of retaliatory personnel actions.'" Furthermore, DODIG "concluded based on a preponderance of the evidence, that these actions would not have occurred or been withheld absent the reports of misconduct." In 2022, Vindman announced his retirement from the U.S. Army after 25 years of service, stating that the retaliation from the White House had irreparably harmed his career

Personal life
Vindman is married to Cindy Vindman, née Groff. The couple has two children, a son born in 2004 and a daughter born in 2010. His identical twin is Lieutenant Colonel Alexander Vindman. Vindman has an older brother, Leonid Vindman, who also served in the Army.

Vindman was elected mayor of Between, Georgia in 2001.

Military awards
At his retirement, Vindman is pending receipt of the Legion of Merit. Vindman's additional awards and decorations include the Meritorious Service Medal with silver oak leaf cluster (6th award); Army Commendation Medal with two oak leaf clusters (3rd award); Army Achievement Medal with two oak leaf clusters (3rd award); National Defense Service Medal; Global War on Terrorism Expeditionary Medal; Global War on Terrorism Service Medal; Army Service Ribbon; Overseas Service Ribbon (2nd award); Army Reserve Overseas Training ribbon; National Defense Service Medal; Valorous Unit Award; and Joint Meritorious Unit award. He earned the Expert Infantryman Badge; Air Assault Badge; Basic Parachutist Badge; the Presidential Service Badge; and the Army Staff Identification Badge.

References

1975 births
Living people
People from Brighton Beach
American people of Ukrainian-Jewish descent
Binghamton University alumni
Central Michigan University alumni
University of Georgia School of Law alumni
American twins
United States Army colonels
First impeachment of Donald Trump